This list of fossil fish research presented in 2022 is a list of new taxa of jawless vertebrates, placoderms, acanthodians, fossil cartilaginous fishes, bony fishes, and other fishes that were described during the year, as well as other significant discoveries and events related to paleoichthyology that occurred in 2022.

Jawless vertebrates

Jawless vertebrate research
 A study on the phylogenetic relationships and evolutionary history of lampreys is published by Brownstein & Near (2022), who find Mesomyzon mengae to be a member of the lamprey crown group, and argue that living lamprey biodiversity results from diversifications extending from the Cretaceous to present, rather than gradually accumulating since the Paleozoic.
 Chevrinais et al. (2022) describe the ontogeny of Euphanerops longaevus.
 Meng et al. (2022) describe new fossil material of Pterogonaspis yuhaii from the Devonian Xujiachong Formation (Yunnan, China), providing new information on the cranial anatomy of this galeaspid, including the first fossil evidence for the position of the esophagus in galeaspids.
 The first detailed description of the complex of external endolymphatic structures in headshields of members of the genus Tremataspis from the Silurian of Estonia, with tiny platelets located within the openings of the endolymphatic duct and possibly functioning as a sieve that allowed or prevented material from entering the inner ear, is published by Märss, Wilson & Viljus (2022).

Placoderms

Placoderm research
 A study on the morphology and function of the antiarch jaw apparatus is published by Lebedev et al. (2022).
 Wang & Zhu (2022) describe the squamation and scale morphology of Parayunnanolepis xitunensis, recognize at least thirteen morphotypes of scales in P. xitunensis, and interpret their findings as indicative of the high regionalization of squamation at the root of jawed vertebrates.
 Zhu et al. (2022) redescribe the pelvic region of the holotype of Parayunnanolepis xitunensis, and report that, instead of having two large plates previously designated as dermal pelvic girdles, P. xitunensis had three pairs of lateral pelvic plates and one large oval median pelvic plate.
 Trinajstic et al. (2022) report preservation of a three-dimensionally mineralized heart, thick-walled stomach and bilobed liver from members of Arthrodira from the Devonian Gogo Formation (Australia), and interpret this finding as indicative of the presence of a flat S-shaped heart separated from the liver and other abdominal organs, and of the absence of lungs in members of Arthrodira.

Acanthodians

Acanthodian research
 A study aiming to quantify the completeness of the acanthodian fossil record is published by Schnetz et al. (2022).
 A study on the biomechanical properties and likely function of bony spines in front of the fins of members of the genus Machaeracanthus is published by Ferrón et al. (2022).

Cartilaginous fishes

Cartilaginous fish research
 Duffin, Lauer & Lauer (2022) describe chimaeroid egg cases from the Upper Jurassic (Tithonian) Altmühltal Formation (Germany), probably produced by Ischyodus quenstedti, and name a new ichnotaxon Chimaerotheca schernfeldensis.
 Revision of the fossil material originally attributed to Bibractopiscis niger and Orthacanthus commailli, and a study on the implications of these fossils for the knowledge of the evolution of neurocranium in "ctenacanthiforms" and xenacanthiforms, is published by Luccisano et al. (2022).
 A study on the evolutionary history of members of the genus Orthacanthus from France and on their relationships with the other European species is published by Luccisano et al. (2022).
 Greif, Ferrón & Klug (2022) describe the first known fossil cartilage remains from the Devonian Hangenberg black shale from the Moroccan Anti-Atlas, and interpret its morphology as suggestive of ctenacanth affiliation.
 Taxonomic reassessment of a hybodontiform dental assemblage from the lower Kimmeridgian of Czarnogłowy (Poland), and a study on the implications of this assemblage for the knowledge of ecology and biogeography of cartilaginous fishes prior to the Jurassic/Cretaceous transition, is published by Stumpf, Meng & Kriwet (2022)
 Fossil teeth of sharks belonging to the groups Hexanchiformes, Echinorhiniformes, Squaliformes and Lamniformes, including the first record of Protosqualus in northwestern Pacific reported to date, are described from the Upper Cretaceous Nishichirashinai and Omagari formations (Yezo Group, Japan) by Kanno et al. (2022).
 New fossil material of Xampylodon dentatus, including more complete teeth or specimens representing teeth of different positions than most previous records, and the oldest fossil material of Rolfodon tatere reported to date is described from the Upper Cretaceous (Campanian) of James Ross Island (Antarctica) by dos Santos et al. (2022).
 Feichtinger et al. (2022) describe isolated teeth of Protoxynotus misburgensis from the Santonian of Lebanon, representing the first known record of this species from the southern Tethyan Realm, and interpret this finding as indicating that Protoxynotus and Cretascymnus occupied overlapping or similar habitats during the Late Cretaceous.
 Herraiz et al. (2022) describe teeth of a member of the genus Trigonognathus from the El Ferriol outcrop (Miocene of Spain), representing the first known record of this genus from the Mediterranean realm.
 Revision of the fossil record of the genus Echinorhinus in South America is published by Bogan & Agnolín (2022), who consider Echinorhinus pozzi and Echinorhinus maremagnum to be valid species, and consider E. maremagnum to be distinct from Echinorhinus lapaoi.
 A study on the anatomy, growth and ecology of Cretodus crassidens, based on data from a specimen from the Turonian "Lastame" lithofacies of the Scaglia Rossa Veneta (Lessini Mountains, Veneto, northeastern Italy), is published by Amalfitano et al. (2022).
 A tooth of Cetorhinus huddlestoni, as well as gill rakers differing from previously described cetorhinids and referred to the same species as the tooth, are described from the Miocene Duho Formation (South Korea) by Malyshkina, Nam & Kwon (2022).
 A study aiming to determine whether the observed body forms of lamniform sharks are influenced by thermophysiology, and reevaluating the body form of Otodus megalodon proposed by Cooper et al. (2020), is published by Sternes, Wood & Shimada (2022).
 A study on the putative nursery areas and body size patterns across different populations of Otodus megalodon is published by Shimada et al. (2022), who report that specimens of O. megalodon are on average larger in cooler water than those in warmer water, and argue that the previously identified nursery areas may reflect temperature-dependent trends rather than the inferred reproductive strategy.
 McCormack et al. (2022) demonstrate the use of zinc isotopes to assess the trophic level in extant and extinct sharks, and interpret their findings as indicative of dietary shifts throughout the Neogene in sharks belonging to the genera Otodus and Carcharodon, and indicating that Early Pliocene sympatric great white sharks and Otodus megalodon likely occupied a similar mean trophic level.
 Evidence from nitrogen isotope ratios in fossil teeth of members of the genus Otodus, indicating that O. megalodon occupied a higher trophic level than is known for any marine species, extinct or extant, is presented by Kast et al. (2022).
 Cooper et al. (2022) create the first three-dimensional model of the body of Otodus megalodon and use it to infer its movement and feeding ecology, interpreting it as likely able to swim great distances and to feed on prey as large as modern apex predators.
 A study on tooth marks on physeteroid bones from the Miocene Pisco Formation (Peru) is published by Benites-Palomino et al. (2022), who interpret their findings as indicating that Miocene sharks were actively targeting the foreheads of physeteroids to feed on their lipid-rich nasal complexes, with the shape and distribution of the bite marks suggesting a series of consecutive scavenging events by members of different shark species.
 A study on the evolutionary history of carcharhiniform sharks is published by Brée, Condamine & Guinot (2022), who interpret their findings as indicative of an early low diversity period followed by a radiation exacerbated since 30 million years ago, as well as indicating that variations in diversification through time were likely linked to reef expansion and temperature change.
 Greenfield, Delsate & Candoni (2022) coin a new name Toarcibatidae for the family of Toarcian batomorphs previously referred to as Archaeobatidae.
 A study on the microstructure of rostral denticles of Ischyrhiza mira is published by Cook et al. (2022)
 New record of large dermal tubercles and bucklers, including tubercles similar in morphology to "Ceratoptera unios" and dermal bucklers similar in morphology to those of the extant roughtail stingray, is reported from the Lower Pleistocene Waccamaw Formation (South Carolina, United States) by Boessenecker & Gibson (2022), who interpret this findings as likely fossils of large stingrays in excess of 3 m disc width.
 A study on the phylogenetic relationships of extant and fossil rays and skates is published by Villalobos-Segura et al. (2022).
 A study on the completeness of the chondrichthyan fossil record from Florida, aiming to determine patterns in taxonomic and ecomorphological diversity of Eocene to Pleistocene chondrichthyans from the Florida Platform, is published by Perez (2022).
 Szabó et al. (2022) describe an assemblage of cartilaginous fishes from the Miocene Tekeres Schlieren Member of the Baden Formation (Hungary), including the first known records of deepwater cartilaginous fishes from the Badenian of the Central Paratethys.
 Fossil material of a diverse shark and ray fauna is reported from the early Pleistocene of Taiwan by Lin, Lin & Shimada (2022).

Ray-finned fishes

Ray-finned fish research
 A new database of the occurrences of Paleozoic ray-finned fishes is presented by Henderson et al. (2022), who evaluate the impact of fossil record biases, as well as taxonomic and phylogenetic issues, on the knowledge of the early evolution of ray-finned fishes; subsequently Henderson, Dunne & Giles (2022) use this database to study patterns of diversity of ray-finned fishes through the Paleozoic, taking the extent and impact of sampling biases into account.
 A novel mode of fang accommodation, with teeth of the lower jaw inserting into fenestrae of the upper jaw, is reported in Brazilichthys macrognathus by Figueroa & Andrews (2022).
 Redescription and a study on the affinities of Toyemia is published by Bakaev & Kogan (2022).
 Redescription of the anatomy and a study on the affinities of Brachydegma caelatum is published by Argyriou, Giles & Friedman (2022).
 Osteoderms providing evidence of presence of large sturgeons (within the upper size bracket for Acipenseridae) in early-middle Paleocene freshwater ecosystems of western North America are described from the Fort Union Formation (Montana, Unitd States) by Brownstein (2022).
 Fossil material of a member or a relative of the genus Eomesodon, representing the oldest record of pycnodonts from East Gondwana reported to date, is described from the Middle Jurassic (Bathonian) Jaisalmer Formation (Rajasthan, India) by Kumar et al. (2022).
 A study on the tooth replacement pattern and implantation in Serrasalmimus secans is published by Matsui & Kimura (2022), who interpret their findings as indicating that serrasalmimid pycnodont fish independently acquired a vertical replacement in true thecodont implantation, i.e. a characteristic tooth replacement pattern of mammals.
 A study on the phylogenetic relationships and evolutionary history of extant and extinct gars is published by Brownstein et al. (2022).
 Redescription and a study on the affinities of Saurostomus esocinus is published by Cooper & Maxwell (2022),  who interpret this taxon as the basalmost transitional member of the suspension-feeding clade of pachycormids.
 A study on bone repair in response to damage in Leedsichthys problematicus is published by Johanson et al. (2022).
 Redescription and a study on the affinities of Thaumaturus intermedius is published by Micklich & Arratia (2022).
 Redescription of "Diplomystus" solignaci is published by Marramà, Khalloufi & Carnevale (2022), who interpret this fish as a paraclupeid ellimmichthyiform, and transfer it to the genus Paraclupea.
 A study on cranial morphological features that diagnose known families of catfishes, and on their implications for the knowledge of the affinities of catfishes from the Paleogene of Africa, is published by Murray & Holmes (2022), who reassess the familial placement of the Paleogene African catfishes and assign Eomacrones wilsoni to the family Bagridae sensu stricto.
 Description of new fossil material of Enchodus from the Cenomanian of Ukraine, and a revision of earlier records of Enchodus from Ukraine, is published by Kovalchuk, Barkaszi & Anfimova (2022).
 Redescription and a study on the phylogenetic affinities of Protosyngnathus sumatrensis is published by Murray (2022).
 A study on the phylogenetic affinities of fossil gobioids is published by Gierl et al. (2022).
 New specimen of Mene rhombea with extensive soft tissue preservation and striking colour patterning is described from the Eocene (Ypresian) Monte Bolca Lagerstätte (Italy) by Rossi et al. (2022).
 A study on patterns of body size evolution of tetraodontiforms in relation to paleoclimate events is published by Troyer et al. (2022).
 Přikryl et al. (2022) describe a new specimen of Archaeotetraodon winterbottomi from the Oligocene Rybnytsia Member of the Menilite Series (Ukraine), providing new information on the anatomy of this tetraodontid.

Lobe-finned fishes

Lobe-finned fish research
 Review of the phylogenetic analyses of onychodont relationships, aiming to determine the sources of discrepancies in the different phylogenetic hypotheses, is published by Ciudad Real et al. (2022).
 A study on the histology of the median fin bones and life history of Miguashaia bureaui is published by Mondéjar Fernandez et al. (2022).
 Toriño et al. (2022) describe a large mawsoniid coelacanth from the Upper Jurassic Kimmeridge Clay (United Kingdom), interpret its morphology as unexpectedly similar to the morphology of Mawsonia, and consider the studied coelacanth to be either an unknown Mawsonia-like form or a member of the lineage of Trachymetopon with some morphological characters previously assumed as diagnostic for Mawsonia.
 Description of cranial endocasts of six Paleozoic lungfish (Iowadipterus halli, Gogodipterus paddyensis, Pillararhynchus longi, Griphognathus whitei, Orlovichthys limnatis, Rhinodipterus ulrichi), and a study on the evolution of crania, brains and sensory abilities of lungfish, is published by Clement et al. (2022).
 Description of two well-preserved specimens of Youngolepis praecursor from the Devonian Xitun Formation (China), and a study on the implications of these specimens for the knowledge of the evolution of the specialized lungfish feeding mechanism, is published by Cui et al. (2022).
 A study on the anatomy of the neurocrania of Scaumenacia curta and Pentlandia macroptera is published by Boirot, Challands & Cloutier (2022), who report that the neurocranium of P. macroptera was at least partially ossified, while S. curta had a cartilaginous neurocranium, and evaluate the implications of their findings for the knowledge of paedomorphosis in lungfish evolution.
 A study on the histology of the tooth plates of Metaceratodus baibianorum from the Upper Cretaceous La Colonia Formation (Argentina) is published by Panzeri, Pereyra & Cione (2022).
 A study on the anatomy and affinities of Palaeospondylus gunni is published by Hirasawa et al. (2022), who interpret this taxon as a sarcopterygian, and likely a stem-tetrapod.

Other

General research
 A study on the evolution of swimming speed in early vertebrates, inferred from caudal fin morphology of Paleozoic cyclostomes (Myxinidae and Petromyzontidae), jawless stem gnathostomes (Conodonta, Anaspida, Pteraspidomorphi, Thelodonti and Osteostraci) and placoderms, is published by Ferrón & Donoghue (2022), who interpret their findings as indicating that microsquamous taxa (thelodonts and anaspids) had higher swimming capabilities than vertebrates with rigid bony carapaces (including placoderms), that demonstrating that the rise of active nektonic vertebrates long-predated the Devonian.
 A study on the morphological similarities of Silurian and Devonian jawless and jawed vertebrates, aiming to determine which groups were most and least likely to have competed (and whether competition with jawed vertebrates was likely to cause the extinction of the majority of jawless vertebrates), is published by Scott & Anderson (2022), who don't find support for overall competitive exclusion of jawless vertebrates by jawed vertebrates.
 A study on the evolution of the vertebrate spiracular region from jawless vertebrates to tetrapods is published by Gai et al. (2022).
 A study on the mandibular morphology of Silurian and Devonian jawed vertebrates, and on the functional capabilities of their jaws, is published by Deakin et al. (2022).
 Description of the ichthyolith assemblage from the Upper Triassic Luning Formation (Nevada, United States), increasing known diversity of marine vertebrates in the western United States in the Late Triassic from four to at least 14 genera, is published by Tackett, Zierer & Clement (2022), who report evidence of the presence of taxa that were previously known only from Europe during the Late Triassic.
 Revision of the marine fish fauna from the Upper Cretaceous (Campanian) Rybushka Formation (Saratov Oblast, Russia) is published by Ebersole et al. (2022).
 A study aiming to reconstruct the fish community and oceanographic conditions off the coast of Peru during the last interglacial, based on data from sediments from the northern Humboldt Current system, is published by Salvatteci et al. (2022).
 Review of the fossil material providing information on the reproduction of extinct fishes is published by Capasso (2022), who names new ootaxa Theutonicootheca primigenia (possible egg capsule of jawless vertebrates or placoderms from the Emsian Kaub Formation, Germany), Beargulchootheca carbonifera (possible egg capsule of cartilaginous fishes from the Mississippian Bear Gulch Limestone of the Heath Formation, Montana, United States), Palaeochimaerootheca browni (egg capsule of chimaerids from the Pennsylvanian Cherokee Shale, Missouri, and Mazon Creek fossil beds, Illinois, United States), and Parascylliootheca libanica (egg capsule of parascylliids from the Cretaceous Sannine Formation, Lebanon).

References 

2022 in paleontology